This is a list of nature centers.

Americas

United States

List of nature centers in Alabama
List of nature centers in Alaska
List of nature centers in Arizona
List of nature centers in Arkansas
List of nature centers in California
List of nature centers in Colorado
List of nature centers in Connecticut
List of nature centers in Delaware
List of nature centers in Florida
List of nature centers in Georgia (U.S. state)
List of nature centers in Illinois
List of nature centers in Indiana
List of nature centers in Iowa
List of nature centers in Kansas
List of nature centers in Kentucky
List of nature centers in Maine
List of nature centers in Maryland
List of nature centers in Massachusetts
List of nature centers in Michigan
List of nature centers in Minnesota
List of nature centers in Mississippi
List of nature centers in Missouri
List of nature centers in New Hampshire
List of nature centers in New Jersey
List of nature centers in New York
List of nature centers in North Carolina
List of nature centers in Ohio
List of nature centers in Oklahoma
List of nature centers in Oregon
List of nature centers in Pennsylvania
List of nature centers in Rhode Island
List of nature centers in South Carolina
List of nature centers in South Dakota
List of nature centers in Tennessee
List of nature centers in Texas
List of nature centers in Utah
List of nature centers in Vermont
List of nature centers in Virginia
List of nature centers in Washington (state)

Canada

Costa Rica
Arenal Eco Zoo, Costa Rica
Monteverde Nature Center, Costa Rica
Selvatura Park, Costa Rica

Panama
Marine Exhibition Center of Punta Culebra, Panama City

Trinidad and Tobago
Asa Wright Nature Centre, Trinidad and Tobago

Brazil
Instituto Butantan, Brazil

Africa

South Africa
Delta Environmental Centre, Parkview, South Africa

Asia

China
Lions Nature Education Centre, Sai Kung District, Hong Kong
Fanling Environmental Resource Centre, Fanling, Hong Kong
Old Wan Chai Post Office, Wan Chai

India
 Bhavan’s Nature and Adventure Centre, Andheri West, Mumbai
 Maharashtra Nature Park, Dharavi, Mumbai

Japan
 Gunma Insect World

Korea
 Suncheon Bay Ecological Park

Malaysia
 Kota Kinabalu Wetland Centre

Taiwan
 Chukou Nature Center

Europe

Andorra
Nature Interpretation Centre, Ordino

Belgium
Riveo Centre, Hotton

Denmark
Fjordcentret Voer Færgested
Klostermølle, Skanderborg
NaturBornholm, Aakirkeby
Skagen Odde Nature Centre, Skagen

Estonia
 Ice Age Centre

Finland
 Siida, Inari
 Villa Elfvik, Espoo

Germany
 Langeneß Wadden Sea Station, Langeneß, Schleswig-Holstein
 Müritzeum, Waren (Müritz), Mecklenburg-Vorpommern

Norway
Authorized visitor centres Norway 
Agder Natural History Museum and Botanical Garden
Hardangervidda Natursenter

Republic of Ireland
Wildlife and Heritage Centre, Clontibret

Spain
Ataria, Salburua, Basque Country
Cabarceno Natural Park, Cantabria
 Granollers Museum of Natural Sciences, Granollers, Catalonia
The Nature Center of Menorca, Ferreries, Balearic Islands

Switzerland
 Nature centres of Pro Natura,  Aletsch and Champ-Pittet in Yverdon-les-Bains

United Kingdom

Oceania

Australia

New Zealand
 Pukaha / Mount Bruce National Wildlife Centre, New Zealand

References